Optical 88 is a chain of eyewear stores in Hong Kong. It was established in 1984, as a member of Stelux Group of Companies, who owns largest professional optical retail network in Hong Kong.

Areas served 
Optical 88's headquarters is located in Hong Kong with branches across Hong Kong Island, Kowloon and the New Territories) while overseas stores are located at various countries and cities including Macau, Guangzhou, Singapore, Thailand and Malaysia.

Products and Services 
Optical 88 sells eyeglasses and frames, including sunglasses. They also provide eye examination services.

See also 
 Eyeglasses

References

External links 
 Official Website

Retail companies of Hong Kong